Arizona is a 1931 American pre-Code drama film directed by George B. Seitz and starring Laura La Plante, John Wayne and June Clyde. It is one of several films based on Augustus Thomas's 1899 play of the same name. Filmed as "Arizona", the movie's makers applied to the New York State Censor Board for a new title, "Men Are Like That", and the film was released and reviewed under that title in New York and elsewhere. (It was copyrighted under the title Arizona however, and was years later reissued under that name.)  The film was released in the U.K. as The Virtuous Wife.

Plot
While at West Point, Lt. Bob Denton rebuffs Evelyn Palmer, who shows up later in Arizona as the wife of his commanding officer. Denton gets involved in a romantic relationship with Evelyn's younger sister, Bonnie. To keep him from marrying her sister, Evelyn falsely accuses Denton of sexually harassing her, which leads to his being expelled from the academy. She later learns that he and her sister had already been secretly married, however, which leads her to admit her lie about him to her husband, Colonel Bonham, who then reinstates the framed Denton.

Cast
Laura La Plante as Evelyn Palmer Bonham
John Wayne as Lt. Bob Denton
June Clyde as Bonita "Bonnie" Palmer
Forrest Stanley as Colonel Frank Bonham
Nina Quartero as Conchita
Susan Fleming as Dot
Adrian Morris as Officer

See also
 John Wayne filmography
 Arizona (1913)
 Arizona (1918)

References

External links

1931 films
American drama films
1931 drama films
Columbia Pictures films
Films directed by George B. Seitz
Films set in Arizona
American films based on plays
American black-and-white films
1930s English-language films
1930s American films